Luciano Gaudino (born July 13, 1958 in Pompei) is a retired Italian professional footballer.

He played in ten games, scoring two goals, in Serie A for A.C. Milan in the 1977–78 season.

He represented Italy at the 1977 FIFA World Youth Championship.

References

1958 births
Living people
Italian footballers
Italy youth international footballers
Serie A players
Serie B players
A.C. Milan players
S.S.C. Bari players
Frosinone Calcio players
Reggina 1914 players
S.S.D. Varese Calcio players

Association football forwards